Dave (દવે) is a Gujarati Brahmin surname. This surname is common amongst the Audichya Brahmins hailing from the Indian state of Gujarat. Many Audichya Brahmins assumed this surname to indicate their expertise and mastery over two Vedas. This surname also denotes the Brahmin caste. It is derived from Sanskrit   "(one who has studied) two Vedas" (via Middle Indo-Aryan duvea then Old Gujarati duve).

Notable people with the surname
 Ashok Dave (born 1952), Indian Gujarati columnist and humourist
 Balmukund Dave (1916–1993), Indian Gujarati journalist and poet
 Eva Dave (1931–2009), Indian Gujarati writer
 Jyotindra Dave (1901–1980), Indian Gujarati humourist
 Harindra Dave (1930–1995), Indian Gujarati poet, journalist, playwright and novelist
 Harish Krishnaram Dave (born 1953), Indian Gujarati poet and translator known as Harish Meenashru
 Himmatlal Ramchandra Dave (1887–1976), Indian Gujarati writer and monk known as Swami Anand

 Ishan Davé (born 1989), Canadian actor

 Kavin Dave (born 1984), Indian film actor
 Ketki Dave (born 1960), Indian film actress
 Kinjal Dave (born 1999), Indian singer from Gujarat
 Makarand Dave (1922–2005), Indian Gujarati poet and author
 Mauli Dave (born 1987), Indian singer
 Narmadashankar Dave (1833–1886), Indian Gujarati activist and writer known as Narmad
 Ranchhodbhai Dave (1837–1923), Indian Gujarati playwright and writer
 Raksha Dave (born 1977), British archaeologist and television presenter

See also
 Dwivedi

References

Gujarati-language surnames